The official flag of New Mexico consists of a red sun symbol of the Zia people on a field of gold (yellow). It was officially adopted in 1925 to highlight the state's Native American and Hispano heritage: It combines a symbol of the Puebloan people, who have ancient roots in the state, with the colors of the flag of Spain, which established and ruled  for over two and a half centuries.

The New Mexico flag is among the most unique and recognizable in the United States, and has been noted for its simple and aesthetic design. It is one of four U.S. state flags without the color blue (along with Alabama, California, and Maryland) and the only one among the four without the color white. The flag of New Mexico is also one of only two U.S. state flags (besides Oklahoma) to include distinct Native American iconography.

The proportions of the symbol are fixed by New Mexico law: The four groups of rays are set at right angles, with the two inner rays one-fifth longer than the outer rays, and the diameter of the circle in the center is one-third the width of the symbol.

History

Previous flag 
During its first thirteen years as a state, New Mexico did not have an official flag. The San Diego World's Fair of 1915, which occurred three years after New Mexico's admission to the union, featured an exhibit hall where all U.S. state flags were displayed; lacking an official flag, New Mexico displayed an unofficial one designed by Ralph Emerson Twitchell, the mayor of the state capital, Santa Fe. Known as the "Twitchell flag", it consisted of a blue field with the U.S. flag in the upper left corner, the words "New Mexico" in silver lettering in the center of the flag, the number "47" in the upper right corner (in reference to New Mexico being the 47th state), and the state seal in the bottom right corner (which in some historical references is wrapped with the world "The Sunshine State"). As of 2005, the only known Twitchell flag in existence was displayed at the Palace of the Governors in Santa Fe.

Redesign 
In 1920, the New Mexico chapter of the Daughters of the American Revolution (DAR) called for the creation of an official flag that would reflect the state's unique heritage and culture. A statewide contest was held in 1923 to solicit new designs. Eventually, a design made by Dr. Harry Mera of Santa Fe and sewn by his wife Reba Mera was selected. In 1925, Governor Arthur T. Hannett signed legislation proclaiming the Mera design the official state flag, which remains in use and unchanged to this day.
Dr. Mera was a physician and archaeologist who was familiar with the Zia sun symbol found at Zia Pueblo on a 19th century pottery jar. The symbol has sacred meaning to the Zia people. Four is a sacred number symbolizing the Circle of Life: the four directions, the four times of day, the four stages of life, and the four seasons; the circle binds these four elements of four together. The salutation, "I salute the flag of the State of New Mexico and the Zia symbol of perfect friendship among united cultures", is commonly recited in New Mexico public schools after the United States pledge of allegiance.

The New Mexico flag was rated first in a 2001 survey of 72 U.S. and Canadian flags by the North American Vexillological Association.

Adoption

Pledge to the New Mexico State Flag 

The pledge to the state flag is available in English and Spanish:

See also
 Great Seal of the State of New Mexico
 Flag of the Navajo Nation

Notes

References

External links

New Mexico state symbols

New Mexico
Symbols of New Mexico